Liberto dos Santos (born 1 February 1908, date of death unknown) was a former Portuguese footballer who played as forward.

Football career 
Liberto dos Santos gained 5 caps for Portugal and made his debut 24 January 1926 in Porto, in a 1–1 draw with Czechoslovakia. He was a non-playing member of Portugals squad for the 1928 Football Olympic tournament.

References

External links 
 
 

1908 births
Portuguese footballers
Association football forwards
Portugal international footballers
Olympic footballers of Portugal
Footballers at the 1928 Summer Olympics
Year of death missing
Place of birth missing